Ahmed Elmeleigy Yousef is a food engineer, scientist and author, currently the Virginia Hutchison Bazler and Frank E. Bazler Designated Professorship in Food Science at Ohio State University, and is also a published author.

References

Year of birth missing (living people)
Living people
American food engineers
American food writers
Ohio State University faculty